Dichorhavirus is a genus of negative sense, single-stranded RNA viruses of plants within the family Rhabdoviridae. Dichorhaviruses have segmented genomes and their short bacilliform virions are not enveloped. Dichorhaviruses are transmitted by mites.

Taxonomy
The following species are recognized:
 Citrus chlorotic spot dichorhavirus
 Citrus leprosis N dichorhavirus
 Clerodendrum chlorotic spot dichorhavirus
 Coffee ringspot dichorhavirus
 Orchid fleck dichorhavirus

References

Rhabdoviridae
Virus genera